Hymenoxys brandegeei is a species of flowering plant in the daisy family known by the common names Brandegee's four-nerve daisy, Brandegee's rubberweed or western bitterweed. It is native to the states of Arizona, Colorado, and  New Mexico in the southwestern United States.

One plant generally produces one flower head per stem, up to 10 per plant. Each head has 14–23ray flowers and 150–250 disc flowers.

The oldest available name for this plant is Actinella grandiflora var. glabrata, coined in 1874. In elevating the taxon to species status, Asa Gray opted to forgo the common but not mandatory custom of using the varietal epithet as a species epithet. He chose instead to call the species Actinella brandegei.

References

External links

brandegeei
Flora of the Southwestern United States
Plants described in 1874